Freddie Solomon (January 11, 1953 – February 13, 2012) was a professional American football player who was selected by the Miami Dolphins in the 2nd round of the 1975 NFL Draft. A native of Sumter, South Carolina, he was a graduate of Sumter High School class of 1971. A 5-foot-11, 184-pound wide receiver from the University of Tampa (where he had played quarterback), Solomon played in 11 NFL seasons for the Dolphins and San Francisco 49ers from 1975 to 1985. On December 5, 1976, Solomon had a career game, with 5 catches for 114 yards and a touchdown, 1 rushing attempt for 59 yards and a touchdown, and a punt return for 79 yards and a touchdown. Solomon won two Super Bowls as a member of the 49ers.

On "The Catch", Dwight Clark's famous leaping grab that helped the 49ers beat the Dallas Cowboys in the 1982 NFC Playoffs, Solomon was the primary target on the play, but slipped coming out of his cut. Solomon made several key plays on the 49ers final drive of that game.

Solomon died on February 13, 2012, after a nine-month battle with colon and liver cancer.

References 

1953 births
2012 deaths
American football return specialists
American football wide receivers
Miami Dolphins players
San Francisco 49ers players
Tampa Spartans football players
Sportspeople from Sumter, South Carolina
Players of American football from South Carolina
African-American players of American football
Deaths from colorectal cancer
Deaths from liver cancer
20th-century African-American sportspeople
21st-century African-American people